This is a list of destinations served by Icelandic low-cost carrier Wow Air at the time it ceased operations on 28 March 2019, with some listed destinations already terminated by the time of the airline's shutdown.

Destinations

References

Lists of airline destinations
WOW air